Alessandro Russo (born 6 September 2003) is an Italian footballer who plays as a midfielder for Salernitana.

Career
In the 2019–20 season, Russo played for the Under-17 squad of Lazio.

He made his Serie A debut for Salernitana on 23 January 2022 in a game against Napoli.

References

External links
 

2003 births
Living people
Italian footballers
Association football midfielders
Serie A players
S.S. Lazio players
U.S. Salernitana 1919 players